The Sierra Arana or Sierra de Arana, also known as Sierra Harana, is a mountain range in the center of the province of Granada, southern Spain.

Description
The Sierra Arana is a mostly karstic range, part of the larger Subbaetic System.
According to some geographers it includes other ranges such as the Sierra de Cogollos, the Sierra de la Yedra and the Sierra de Alfacar y Víznar.

Municipalities located in the Sierra Arana include Deifontes, Iznalloz, Cogollos Vega, Huétor Santillán, Diezma, Darro, La Peza, Píñar, Morelábor, and Huélago. The area of the range is bounded in the north by the Comarca of Los Montes and its southern end is included in the area of the Sierra de Huétor and la Alfaguara Natural Park.

See also
Subbaetic System
Baetic System

References

External links
Granada Natural - Las Zonas Externas
Entorno: Parque natural Sierra de Huétor, Granada

Arana
Baetic System
Two-thousanders of Spain